The Royal Conservatoire of Scotland, formerly the Royal Scottish Academy of Music and Drama is a conservatoire of dance, drama, music, production, and film in Glasgow, Scotland. It is a member of the Federation of Drama Schools.

Founded in 1847, it has become the busiest performing arts venue in Scotland with over 500 public performances each year. 
The current principal is American pianist and composer Jeffrey Sharkey. The patron is King Charles III.

History
The Royal Conservatoire has occupied its current purpose-built building on Renfrew Street in Glasgow since 1988.  Its roots lie in several organisations. Officially founded in 1847 by Moses Provan as part of the Glasgow Athenaeum, from an earlier Educational Association grouping, music and arts were provided alongside courses in commercial skills, literature, languages, sciences and mathematics. Courses were open and affordable, including day classes for ladies, and the Athenaeum had a reading room, news room, library and social facilities. Apprentices could also be members. Rented accommodation was found in the Assembly Rooms, Ingram Street, with major lectures taking place in the City Halls. The chairman at its inaugural Grand Soiree in the City Halls in December 1847 was Charles Dickens when in his opening remarks he stated that he regarded the Glasgow Athenaeum as "an educational example and encouragement to the rest of Scotland". Its Dramatic Club was formed in 1886 a year before the institution moved to purpose-built premises, inclusive of a major concert hall/theatre, in St George's Place close to West Nile Street, designed by architect John Burnet.

In 1888, the commercial teaching separated to form the Athenaeum Commercial College, which, after several rebrandings and a merger, became the University of Strathclyde in 1964. The non-commercial teaching side became the Glasgow Athenaeum School of Music.

In 1893 additional premises linked through to Buchanan Street and included a new Athenaeum Theatre facing Buchanan Street designed by architect Sir John James Burnet. In 1928 the premises were substantially extended with a gift from the philanthropist Daniel Macaulay Stevenson. In 1929 the school was renamed as the Scottish National Academy of Music to better reflect its scope and purpose. This major acquisition of space at the corner of St George's Place (later renamed Nelson Mandela Place) and Buchanan Street was the Liberal Club (now not required by that party), designed originally by architect Alexander Skirving and remodelled by architects Campbell Douglas and Paterson in 1907.

Its principal from 1929 to 1941 was William Gillies Whittaker. In 1944, it became the Royal Scottish Academy of Music.

The Royal Scottish Academy of Music established a drama department called the Glasgow College of Dramatic Art during 1950.  It became the first British drama school to contain a full, broadcast-specification television studio in 1962. In 1968 the Royal Scottish Academy of Music changed its name to the Royal Scottish Academy of Music and Drama (RSAMD) and introduced its first degree courses, which were validated by the University of Glasgow.

During 1987–88 the academy moved to its present site some two hundred yards north in Renfrew Street at Hope Street, across from the Theatre Royal, the new building having been designed by architect Sir Leslie Martin with executive architects William Nimmo and Partners.

In 1993 RSAMD became the first conservatoire in the United Kingdom to be granted its own degree-awarding powers. Research degrees undertaken at RSAMD are validated and awarded by the University of St Andrews. RSAMD is one of four member conservatories of the Associated Board of the Royal Schools of Music.

Name change

From 1 September 2011, the RSAMD changed its name to the Royal Conservatoire of Scotland. They decided on the name change after a long consultation process that involved the principal John Wallace and the academy's board of directors, as well as past and present students and staff, arts & academic institutions, politicians, and the Royal Protocol Unit.

The principal said the new name was necessary to cover all fields that the institute offers, as it no longer is simply a music and drama academy. Undergraduate courses in areas such as Digital Film & Television, Production Arts and Design, Production Technology and Management, Musical Theatre and Modern Ballet (in partnership with Scottish Ballet) have been added to the degrees the Royal Conservatoire offers. He felt it was best to choose a name that was representative of all disciplines offered.

International ranking
The Royal Conservatoire of Scotland has been consistently ranked among the best schools in the world in Quacquarelli Symonds (QS)'s Performing Arts ranking since the latter was established in 2016. The Conservatoire has been in the top 10 five out of six years, reaching 3rd place in 2017 and 2021. In 2022, RCS ranked fifth in the world for Performing Arts Education.

Facilities
The Royal Conservatoire of Scotland has a range of facilities, including several performance spaces: the Ledger Room, Stevenson Hall, the Chandler Studio Theatre, the New Athenaeum Theatre, and the Alexander Gibson Opera Studio (built in 1998, the first purpose-built opera school in Britain). There are around 65 private practice rooms for music students, each equipped with a piano with stool, music stand and chairs. These include 11 rooms reserved solely for pianists, several rooms for use by the Traditional Music department, and 8 rehearsal and coaching rooms. The Royal Conservatoire of Scotland also houses several professional recording studios, including a new studio in the Opera School for the use of large ensembles.

The Whittaker Library is housed in the Renfrew Street campus. It contains one of the largest collections of sheet music, scripts and other performing items in both the United Kingdom and the world.

The Royal Conservatoire of Scotland also has an automated flying system in its main performing venue, the New Athenaeum Theatre, meaning it has become the first educational establishment in the UK to offer Stage Automation Training as part of the curriculum.

In 2010, RCS opened its second campus near Cowcaddens, now known as the "Wallace Studios at Speirs Locks". This building was designed by Malcolm Fraser. It opened predominantly to house the Modern Ballet and Production courses, as the Renfrew Street campus was struggling to accommodate the combination of new courses and higher intake levels. In 2014, a £2 million extension to this second campus was built, creating even more rehearsal spaces and improved facilities for the students.

The Royal Conservatoire of Scotland's extensive archive of historical papers and ephemera charts both its own institutional history and the wider performance history of Scotland.

Schools

School of Music
Brass
Chamber Music
Composition
Conducting
Education (Bachelors/PGDE)
Guitar and Harp 
Historically Informed Performance Practice (Masters)
Jazz
Keyboard
Opera (Masters)
Piano Accompaniment 
Piano for Dance (Masters)
Repetiteurship 
Scottish Music
Strings
Timpani and Percussion
Traditional Music
Traditional Music – Piping
Vocal Studies
Woodwind

School of Drama, Dance, Production and Film
Acting
Classical and Contemporary Text (Masters and Master of Fine Arts)
Contemporary Performance Practice
Filmmaking
Performance in British Sign Language and English
Production Arts and Design
Production Technology and Management
Musical Theatre 
Musical Theatre Performance (Masters)
Musical Theatre Directing (PGDip/Masters)
Modern Ballet

Junior Conservatoire
Junior Conservatoire of Music
Junior Conservatoire of Drama
Junior Conservatoire of Production
Junior Conservatoire of Film
Junior Conservatoire of Dance

Alumni

Michael Angelis
James Fullarton Arnott
Stephen Ashfield
Ani Batikian
Maureen Beattie
Fiona Bell
Cora Bissett
Iain Blair
Christine Bottomley
Billy Boyd
Kenny Boyle
Betsy Brandt
Alison Brie
Jack Bruce
Isobel Buchanan
Stuart Cassells
Karen Cargill
John Carlin
Robert Carlyle
Scott Cleverdon
Carrie Cracknell
Tom Conti
Nicholas Cowell
Damian Cruden
Alan Cumming
Tony Curran
Henry Ian Cusick
Louise Delamere
Kate Dickie
Laura Donnelly
Patrick Doyle
Christopher Duncan
Sheena Easton
Valerie Edmond
Emun Elliott
Tom Ellis (actor)
Lynn Ferguson
Emma Fielding
Gregor Fisher
James Fleet
Laura Fraser
Ncuti Gatwa
Alexander Gibson
Michelle Gomez
Stella Gonet
Hannah Gordon
Kevin Guthrie
John Hannah
David Hayman
Ivan Heng
Jeremy Herrin
Sam Heughan
Aneirin Hughes
Tunji Kasim
Bryan Kelly
Louise Kemény
Pauline Knowles
Anne Kristen
Colin Lamont
Gary Lamont
Denis Lawson
Katie Leung
Phyllis Logan
Angela Lonsdale
Jack Lowden
Calum MacCrimmon
Finlay MacDonald
Shauna Macdonald
Richard Madden
Rik Makarem
Lauren Marcus
Mary Marquis
Angus MacPhail
James McAvoy
Colin McCredie
Ian McDiarmid
Greg McHugh
David McVicar
Anthony Michaels-Moore
Siobhan Miller
Colin Morgan
Catriona Morison
Paul Leonard-Morgan
Findlay Napier
Daniela Nardini
Gray O'Brien
Kevin O'Loughlin
Ian Parker
Bill Paterson
Shernaz Patel
Margaret Preece
Nicholas Ralph
Jenna Reid
Ian Richardson
Natalie J. Robb
Anne Sharp
Sean Shibe
Alexandra Silber
Elaine C Smith
Emily Smith
Robyn Stapleton
Dawn Steele
Andrew Stevenson
Svetlina Stoyanova
David Tennant
Brian Vernel
Dougie Vipond
Jonathan Watson
Ruby Wax
Matthew Whiteside
Gareth Williams
Astrid Williamson
Krysty Wilson-Cairns
Julie Wilson Nimmo
Greg Wise
Jayne Wisener

Principals
William G. Whittaker 1929 to 1941
Ernest Bullock 1941 to 1952
Henry Havergal 1953 to 1969
Kenneth Barritt 1969 to 1976
David Lumsden 1976 to 1982
Philip Ledger 1982 to 2001
John Wallace 2002 to 2014
Jeffrey Sharkey 2014 to Present

See also
Music Schools in Scotland
List of further and higher education colleges in Scotland
Conservatoires UK
Music of Scotland 
Culture in Glasgow
Culture of Scotland 
Scottish Ballet
Scottish Opera

References

 Royal Conservatoire of Scotland graduate wins 2017 Linbury Prize for stage design
 Scottish Higher Education Archives
 Glasgow University Archive Service

External links

 

 
Music schools in Scotland
Education in Glasgow
Drama schools in the United Kingdom
Musical instrument museums
Culture in Glasgow
Conservatoire of Scotland
Arts organisations based in Scotland
Educational institutions established in 1845
1845 establishments in Scotland
Drama schools in Scotland